Sonia Benedito  (born ) is a retired Brazilian female volleyball player, who played as a wing spiker.

She was part of the Brazil women's national volleyball team at the 2002 FIVB Volleyball Women's World Championship in Germany. On club level she played with Fluminense Rio de Janeiro.

Clubs
 Fluminense Rio de Janeiro (2002)

References

1978 births
Living people
Brazilian women's volleyball players
Place of birth missing (living people)
Wing spikers
Sportspeople from São Paulo